Gowing is a surname. Notable people with the surname include:

Eric Gowing (1913-1981), Anglican Bishop of Auckland
John Gowing (1835–1908), English-born Australian retailer
Laura Gowing, British historian 
Sir Lawrence Gowing (1918-1991), British artist, writer, curator and teacher
Margaret Gowing  (1921–1998), English historian
Nik Gowing (born 1951), British television journalist

Other uses
 Gowing, a character in The Diary of a Nobody by George and Weedon Grossmith

See also
Gowings, department store chain in Sydney, Australia
Going (disambiguation)
Gowin